The Mainichi Film Award for Best Sound Recording is a film award given at the Mainichi Film Awards.

Award Winners

References

Sound Recording
Awards established in 1947
1947 establishments in Japan
Lists of films by award